Gerardo Ruiz Mateos (born in Mexico City) is a Mexican engineer and politician and the former Secretariat of Economy (2008–2010).

References

External links
Mexico - Presidency of the Republic Website 
National Action Party Website 

Year of birth missing (living people)
Living people
Mexican engineers
National Action Party (Mexico) politicians
Monterrey Institute of Technology and Higher Education alumni
People from Mexico City
Mexican Secretaries of Economy
21st-century Mexican politicians